Model Town is an upscale neighbourhood situated in North Delhi, India. It was built in the early 1950s by the DLF Group, then known as Delhi Land and Finance, and is one of the first privately developed neighborhoods in Delhi. Model Town is a large area and divided into blocks and sub-colonies. It is one of the three administrative divisions of the North Delhi district, along with Alipur and Narela.

History
The Model Town site had earlier formed part of the Delhi Town Planning Committee's preferred site for the construction of New Delhi in 1912. The land lying north of Shahjahanabad was a popular choice as the most suitable location for the new capital city, as the area formed a continuity to the old city, encapsulating the existing Civil Lines area into the new city as well. The area was also associated with the Delhi Durbars, where the coronation ceremonies of three British monarchs were held. 

The site was later shifted to Raisina hill, south of Shahjahanabad owing to expenses of acquiring land and the ideology of establishing new symbolism for the new city, leaving precedents of the old city behind. 

Model Town, developed in the pre-master plan of 1962 phase, was one of the most well planned neighbourhoods, when planning norms did not exist. This affluent residential area was Delhi's first post-independence elite neighbourhood.

Neighbourhood

The Imperial Town Planning Movement gave birth to New Delhi, Model Town and Civil Lines, advocating low-rise orderly development, with large plot sizes and single-storey buildings, with a maximum ground coverage of as little as 25 % of the entire plot area. 
 
Model Town is divided into 3 sub-colonies ; Model Town - I, Model Town - II & Model Town - III.

Accessibility
Model Town is well connected by the Ring Road, and there is now access to the Outer Ring Road as well. 2 Metro Stations (Model Town and Azad Pur) are within easy reach.

Model Town is relatively centrally located, not more than 8 km from the city centre. 
Nearby areas include Azadpur, Derawal Nagar, Mahendru Enclave, Civil Lines, Kingsway Camp, Kamla Nagar,  DR. Mukherji Nagar, Shalimar Bagh, Timarpur, Hudson Lines, Gujranwala Town and the University of Delhi's north campus.

Landmarks
Alpana Cinema (now closed) is situated near Model Town I Crossing which was not only one of the reputed Cinema Halls of Delhi but also a well-known landmark of the area. Chhatrasal Stadium is also situated opposite Model Town III in the area and was used for soccer matches during the Asian Games, held in Delhi, India in the 80s. 
Model Town is connected by the Delhi Metro on the Vishwavidyalaya route and has one stop Model Town metro station.

Its actual postal address is only Model Town 110009, however as it has 3 bus stops on the main road people use too often refer to the location of the stop as a reference landmark (e.g. near Model Town 1st stop) which is now often referred as Model Town 1 or 2 or 3.

Model Town 1 has a lake called Naini Lake in the middle of the locality with a boating facility and has a walking path around the lake for morning and evening walkers. This lake is maintained by the Delhi Tourism.

The Grand Trunk Road (originally built under the reign of Sher Shah Suri) is close to Model Town, and the historic Gurdwara Nanak Piao is located on this road. This Gurdwara Sahib is dedicated to the first Sikh Guru, Sri Guru Nanak Dev. The word "Piao" means to "offer liquid to drink" and refers to the offering of water to all the thirsty who visited this shrine.

The foundation of the new capital of British India, New Delhi, was laid at the nearby Coronation Park by King George V in December, 1911, making this area historically significant.

References 

District subdivisions of Delhi
North Delhi district
Neighbourhoods in Delhi

hi:मॉडल टाउन, दिल्ली